M Maroof Zaman is a former diplomat and the ambassador of Bangladesh to Vietnam. He was a victim of forced disappearance in Bangladesh. He was a former ambassador of Bangladesh to Qatar.

Career
Zaman was commissioned in Bangladesh Army through the 6th Short Course in 1977. He served in the Signal corps and retired, for health reasons, from Bangladesh Army with the rank of captain. In 1982, he joined the Ministry of Foreign Affairs. He worked as a minister at the Bangladesh High Commission in the United Kingdom. He served as the Ambassador of Bangladesh to Vietnam He has Director General in the Foreign Ministry in charge of West Asia, Central Asia, and Africa. In 2004, he was appointed the Ambassador of Bangladesh to Qatar.

Forced disappearance
On 4 December 2017, Zaman was going to the airport to pick up his daughter. He disappeared on the way to the airport. He later called his home from an unknown number and asked his home staff to provide his laptop to a few men who would come to the house. Three men arrived and searched the house. They took away his spare cellphone, camera, and laptop. They also thoroughly searched his room. The men were described as being well built and dressed; with masks and caps covering their faces. His car was found abandoned in Khilkhet. His phone was found switched off later.

Zaman's daughter, Samiha Zaman, filled a General Diary with Bangladesh Police over his disappearance. His daughter campaigned with Mayer Daak, an organisation representing family members of victim of Forced disappearance in Bangladesh, for her father's return. Former Ambassadors of Bangladesh expressed concern over his disappearance.

Zaman returned home on 16 March 2019; he was missing for 467 days. Kazi Reazul Hoque, Chairperson of National Human Rights Commission welcomed his return and called for the discovery of the guilty party. His family confirmed his return, refused to provide additional comments, and requested for privacy.A whistleblower investigation by Sweden-based news portal Netra news in 2022 revealed that Zaman may have been secretly detained at Aynaghar, a secret detention facility of Bangladeshi intelligence organization Directorate General of Forces Intelligence.

See also
List of solved missing person cases
Aynaghar

References

2010s missing person cases
Ambassadors of Bangladesh to Qatar
Ambassadors of Bangladesh to Vietnam
Bangladesh Army officers
Enforced disappearances in Bangladesh
Formerly missing people
Living people
Missing person cases in Bangladesh
Year of birth missing (living people)